Kiribati competed at the 2018 Commonwealth Games in the Gold Coast, Australia from April 4 to April 15, 2018.

Weightlifter David Katoatau was the island's flag bearer during the opening ceremony.

Despite not winning a medal this year, 2014 gold medalist David Katoatau nearly missed out of the podium, finishing 5th in the men's weightlifting 105 kg competition.

Competitors
The following is the list of number of competitors participating at the Games per sport/discipline.

Athletics

Kiribati participated with 2 athletes (1 man and 1 woman).

Track & road events

Boxing

Kiribati participated with a team of 2 athletes (2 men).

Men

Table tennis

Kiribati participated with 3 athletes (3 men).

Singles

Doubles

Team

Weightlifting

Kiribati participated with 5 athletes (4 men and 1 woman).

Wrestling

Kiribati participated with 2 athletes (2 men).

Women

See also
Kiribati at the 2018 Summer Youth Olympics

References

Nations at the 2018 Commonwealth Games
Kiribati at the Commonwealth Games
Com